68 Ophiuchi is a binary star system in the equatorial constellation of Ophiuchus. It is visible to the naked eye as a faint star with an apparent visual magnitude of 4.42. The system is located around  distant from the Sun, based on parallax, and is drifting further away with a radial velocity of +6 km/s.

This is a spectroscopic binary with an orbital period of 177 years and an eccentricity of 0.83. The brighter member, component A, is an A-type main-sequence star of spectral type A2Vn, a star that is currently fusing its core hydrogen. The 'n' suffix indicates "nebulous" lines due to rapid rotation. The star is suspected of varying between magnitudes 4.42 and 4.48. It displays an infrared excess that matches a circumstellar disk of dust orbiting  from the star with a mean temperature of 160 K. The secondary companion, component B, is of magnitude 7.48.

References

A-type main-sequence stars
Suspected variables
Binary stars

Ophiuchus (constellation)
BD+01 3560
Ophiuchi, 68
164577
088290
6723